The Wayfarer (or The Pedlar) is an oil on panel painting by Hieronymus Bosch, created c. 1500. It is currently in Museum Boijmans Van Beuningen in Rotterdam. It is one of the fragments of a partially lost triptych or diptych, which also included the Allegory of Gluttony and Lust, the Ship of Fools and Death and the Miser.

The figure is similar to the man depicted in The Path of Life panel on the exterior of The Haywain Triptych. The character has been interpreted as choosing between the path of virtue at the gate on the right or debauchery in the house on the left, or as the prodigal son returning home from the world.

Legacy
Tim Storrier's self-portrait The Histrionic Wayfarer (after Bosch) won the 2012 Archibald Prize.

References

External links
Journey of Man Google Arts and Culture

Paintings by Hieronymus Bosch
1500s paintings
Paintings in the collection of the Museum Boijmans Van Beuningen
Cattle in art
Dogs in art
Birds in art